Ménil is a commune in the Mayenne department in north-western France. Its population in the census of 1999 was 785 inhabitants.

It is a member of the Community of Pays de Château-Gontier.

See also
Communes of Mayenne
Menil Collection

References

Communes of Mayenne